Alta Val Tidone is a new comune (municipality) in the Province of Piacenza in the Italian region Emilia-Romagna, located about  northwest of Bologna and about  southwest of Piacenza.

Alta Val Tidone borders the following municipalities: Bobbio, Borgonovo Val Tidone, Canevino, Golferenzo, Pianello Val Tidone, Piozzano, Romagnese, Ruino, Santa Maria della Versa, Travo, Volpara, Zavattarello, Ziano Piacentino

It was formed on 1 January 2018 from the union of Caminata, Nibbiano and Pecorara.

References

Cities and towns in Emilia-Romagna